The 2020 season is the first season since the rebranding of Philadelphia Union's reserve team from Bethlehem Steel FC to Philadelphia Union II. Union II will compete in the USL Championship's Eastern Conference.

Current roster

Competitive

USL Championship

Standings — Group F

Match results

U.S. Open Cup 

Due to their affiliation with a higher division professional club (Philadelphia Union), Union II is one of 15 teams expressly forbidden from entering the Cup competition.

References

Philadelphia Union II
Philadelphia Union II
Philadelphia Union II